Cosmoclostis is a genus of moths in the family Pterophoridae.

Species
Cosmoclostis aglaodesma 
Cosmoclostis auxileuca 
Cosmoclostis brachybela 
Cosmoclostis chalconota 
Cosmoclostis gmelina 
Cosmoclostis hemiadelpha 
Cosmoclostis lamprosema 
Cosmoclostis leucomochla 
Cosmoclostis parauxileuca 
Cosmoclostis pesseuta 
Cosmoclostis quadriquadra 
Cosmoclostis schouteni

References 

Pterophorini
Moth genera